Heaven, Earth & Beyond is an album by Swedish singer Lisa Ekdahl, released in 2002.

Track listing
 "Rivers Of Love"  (Salvadore Poe)
 "Open Door"  (Salvadore Poe)
 "Deep Inside Your Dreams"  (Salvadore Poe)
 "When Did You Leave Heaven?"  (Richard A. Whiting, Walter Bullock)
 "All I Really Want Is Love"  (Salvadore Poe)
 "It's Oh So Quiet"  (Hans Lang, Erich Meder)
 "Daybreak"  (Salvadore Poe)
 "Cry Me a River"  (Arthur Hamilton)
 "Now Or Never"  (Curtis Reginald Lewis, Billie Holiday)
 "My Heart Belongs To Daddy"  (Cole Porter)
 "The Color Of You"  (Salvadore Poe)
 "Nature Boy"  (Eden Ahbez)
 "Sunny Weather"  (Salvadore Poe)
 "I Can't Get Started"  (Vernon Duke / Lyrics: Ira Gershwin)
 "But Not For Me"  (George Gershwin / Lyrics: Ira Gershwin)
 "Stranger On Earth"  (Sid Feller, Rick Ward)
 "Open Door"  (Salvadore Poe)

Lisa Ekdahl albums
2002 albums